In 1952, the United States FBI, under Director J. Edgar Hoover, continued for a third year to maintain a public list of the people it regarded as the Ten Most Wanted Fugitives.

As 1952 began, the FBI was seeking a pair of bank robbers, George Arthur Heroux, listed late in the prior year, and his partner Gerhard Arthur Puff, who was listed a few weeks later, into the new year.  Crimes such as bank robbery were typical of top ten in this era.  With ongoing frequent captures, the turnover rate of new fugitives on the list remained high throughout 1952.

1952 fugitives
The "Ten Most Wanted Fugitives" listed by the FBI in 1952 include (in FBI list appearance sequence order):

Sydney Gordon Martin
January 7, 1952 #29
Two years on the list
Sydney Gordon Martin - U.S. prisoner arrested November 27, 1953, in Corpus Christi, Texas, by the FBI without incident following publicity in the Saturday Evening Post

Gerhard Arthur Puff

January 28, 1952 #30 - was added soon after his partner George Arthur Heroux, #28
Six months on the list
Gerhard Arthur Puff - EXECUTED by electric chair at Sing Sing Prison, Ossining, New York August 12, 1954; was a US PRISONER;  was convicted of murder in the first degree May 15, 1953, in the U.S. District Court for the Southern District of New York;  was wounded July 26, 1952, during a gunbattle, after he shot and fatally wounded an FBI Agent waiting to arrest him in the lobby of a hotel in New York City while staying in room 904; had been charged with George Arthur Heroux (Fugitive #28) on December 3, 1951, for the bank robbery and both men were added to the Top Ten fugitives list; with Heroux, he robbed the Johnson County National Bank and Trust Company of Prairie Village, Kansas, on October 25, 1951; had been bailed out (probably by Heroux) on October 17, 1951, to report for trial on November 15, but he did not appear;  had met Heroux while in Milwaukee County Jail, after he was arrested May 2, 1951, by the Milwaukee Police Department for armed robbery; had been released on April 25, 1951; had again been sent to the Wisconsin State Penitentiary in June, 1948, after he was found guilty of breaking and entering a warehouse at Beaver Dam, Wisconsin, and also charged with his 1945 prison escape, received concurrent terms of one to four years and twelve to seventeen months, respectively; had been discharged on November 19, 1947; was apprehended September 21, 1945, in a stolen car and again returned to prison, after he had escaped September 6, 1945; had returned to the penitentiary December 28, 1942, on a sentence of one to nine years, after convicted of assault with intent to commit armed robbery; was discharged on May 24, 1939; had been sentenced to an additional term of one to ten years for assaulting a guard, and was sent back to the State Penitentiary in February, 1937; was transferred in late 1935 to the State Reformatory at Green Bay, Wisconsin; was sentenced August 22, 1935, to serve three concurrent terms of one to five years each in the Wisconsin State Penitentiary for stealing animals

Thomas Edward Young
February 21, 1952 #31
Seven months on the list
Thomas Edward Young - U.S. prisoner was arrested September 23, 1952, in the Boise National Forest, Idaho, without incident after citizens recognized his photograph on
Identification Orders and in newspaper articles

Kenneth Lee Maurer
February 27, 1952 #32
Eleven months on the list
Kenneth Lee Maurer - U.S. prisoner was arrested January 8, 1953, while working at a local cabinet shop in Miami, Florida, after several customers saw his published photograph and contacted the FBI. Because of Mauer's fear of flying, he was allowed to return to Detroit by train to face murder charges.

Isaie Aldy Beausoleil
March 3, 1952 #33
One year on the list
Isaie Aldy Beausoleil - U.S. prisoner arrested June 25, 1953, by a park policewoman while he was spotted dressed as a woman and acting suspicious in a women's restroom in Chicago, Illinois

Leonard Joseph Zalutsky
August 5, 1952 #34
One month on the list
Leonard Joseph Zalutsky - U.S. prisoner arrested September 8, 1952, by local police in Beaver Falls, Pennsylvania, after he was recognized by two citizens from an FBI wanted poster in a post office

William Merle Martin
August 11, 1952 #35
Three weeks on the list
William Merle Martin - U.S. prisoner arrested August 30, 1952, in St. Louis, Missouri, by local police

James Eddie Diggs
August 27, 1952 #36
Nine years on the list
James Eddie Diggs - PROCESS DISMISSED December 14, 1961, in Norfolk, Virginia

Nick George Montos
September 8, 1952 #37
Two years on the list, and also as #94 in 1956
Nick George Montos - reappeared as Fugitive #94 in 1956;  was a U.S. prisoner arrested August 23, 1954, in Chicago, Illinois, when his automobile was identified by two Special Agents, as he and a companion waited for a freight train to pass at a railroad crossing

Theodore Richard Byrd, Jr.
September 10, 1952 #38
Six months on the list
Theodore Richard Byrd, Jr. - U.S. prisoner arrested February 21, 1953, in El Reno, Oklahoma, after an off-duty FBI clerk recognized Byrd from a Wanted Flyer and notified the local police

Harden Collins Kemper
September 17, 1952 #39
Four months on the list
Harden Collins Kemper - U.S. prisoner arrested January 1, 1953, in Glendale, Arizona, after an Arizona Highway Patrolman recognized him from an Identification Order

John Joseph Brennan
October 6, 1952 #40
Four months on the list
John Joseph Brennan - U.S. prisoner arrested January 23, 1953, in Chicago, Illinois, because of a tip from an FBI informant

Later entries
FBI Ten Most Wanted Fugitives, 2020s
FBI Ten Most Wanted Fugitives, 2010s
FBI Ten Most Wanted Fugitives, 2000s
FBI Ten Most Wanted Fugitives, 1990s
FBI Ten Most Wanted Fugitives, 1980s
FBI Ten Most Wanted Fugitives, 1970s
FBI Ten Most Wanted Fugitives, 1960s
FBI Ten Most Wanted Fugitives, 1950s

External links
Current FBI top ten most wanted fugitives at FBI site
FBI pdf source document listing all Ten Most Wanted year by year (removed by FBI)

 
1952 in the United States